"Lovers Live Longer" is a song written by David Bellamy, and recorded by American country music duo The Bellamy Brothers.  It was released in October 1980 as the first single from the album Sons of the Sun.  The song reached No. 3 on the Billboard Hot Country Singles & Tracks chart.

Chart performance

References

1980 singles
The Bellamy Brothers songs
Warner Records singles
Curb Records singles
Songs written by David Bellamy (singer)
1980 songs